Merwin Hancock Silverthorn (September 22, 1896 – August 14, 1985) was a highly decorated Lieutenant General in the United States Marine Corps, Navy Cross recipient. 

He was an expert in amphibious warfare and taught courses at Marine Corps training facilities in the 1930s.  He served in numerous conflicts including World War I as field commander and during World War II as a senior staff officer. Following World War II, Silverthorn served in many important capacities like Assistant Commandant of the Marine Corps, director of the Marine Corps Reserve or commanding general of the Marine Corps Recruit Depot Parris Island.

Early career

Silverthorn was born on 22 September 1896 in Minneapolis, Minnesota, as the son of Civil War veteran, Asahel C. Silverthorn (1844–1940) and his wife Emma C. Silverthorn (1861–1921). He studied at University of Minnesota, but left the university before graduation and enlisted in the Minnesota National Guard. Serving on Mexican Border during the Pancho Villa Expedition, Silverthorn subsequently enlisted in the Marine Corps as a private on 27 April 1917.

World War I

After basic training he was assigned to the newly created 5th Marine Regiment. Silverthorn sailed to France as a member of 16th Company, 3rd Battalion, 5th Marines. He was promoted to sergeant and transferred to the 45th Company of the same Battalion and participated in the Battle of Belleau Wood.

Silverthorn distinguished himself and received a battlefield commission as a second  lieutenant on 9 June 1918. To his new rank, he was appointed platoon leader in the 20th Company, 3rd Battalion. Silverthorn subsequently led his platoon during the battle and was decorated with the Silver Star for gallantry in action.

He commanded his platoon during the Battle of Château-Thierry, Battle of Soissons and Second Battle of the Marne. Silverthorn was ordered to Army school for further training during the August 1918.

He returned in the middle of September and subsequently commanded his platoon during the Battle of Blanc Mont Ridge. Silverthorn was decorated with his second Silver Star for his leadership during the beginning of the battle. During the combats near the village of St. Etienne on 4 October 1918, he carried an important message, at a critical time, to his battalion commander under heavy machine-gun and shell fire, exhibiting extraordinary heroism and disregard for his personal safety. After being wounded, he then continued the attack. For his actions, Silverthorn was decorated with the Distinguished Service Cross and later with the Navy Cross. He was also decorated with the French Croix de guerre 1914–1918 with Gilt Star and promoted to the rank of first lieutenant.

Interwar period

After the war, Silverthorn remained in the Europe and participated in the Allied occupation of the Rhineland and 'Pershing's Own' E Company, 3rd Army Composite Regiment until September 1919. He subsequently returned to the United States and was assigned to the Marine Barracks at Mare Island, California. Silverthorn served there until April 1921, when he was transferred to the Marine Barracks at Quantico. He was subsequently promoted to the rank of captain on 1 July 1921.

At the beginning of May 1923, Silverthorn was assigned to the 1st Brigade of Marines and sent to Haiti in March 1924, where he served as district commander within Gendarmerie d'Haïti at Aux Cayes and later as chief of police at Port-au-Prince. In this capacity, Silverthorn was responsible for the training and organizing of police units. He returned to the States in May 1926 and was appointed assistant quartermaster at Quantico Base, Virginia.

Silverthorn was transferred to the Marine Barracks at Guam in April 1930 and appointed to the same role as at Quantico.

World War II

At the time of the Japanese Attack on Pearl Harbor, Silverthorn served still in Washington, D.C., at War Plans Section – Operations Department, Navy Department under Admiral Ernest King. He was promoted to the rank of colonel in January 1942 and transferred as Naval member to the Joint U.S. Strategic Committee, Joint Chiefs of Staff. Silverthorn remained in this capacity until June 1943, when he was assigned to the Army Navy Staff College as Chief of the Amphibious Warfare Section. For his service in this capacity, he was decorated with the Army Commendation Medal at the end of his assignment in January 1944.

Silverthorn was then finally transferred to the Pacific theater and appointed chief of staff of I Marine Amphibious Corps under Lieutenant General Roy Geiger. He relieved Brigadier General Oscar R. Cauldwell in this capacity, while stationed at Guadalcanal. The I Marine Amphibious Corps was redesignated III Amphibious Corps in April 1944 and started to prepare for  Mariana and Palau Islands campaign.

At the end of July 1944, Silverthorn participated in the Recapture of Guam and made several trips to the front line positions to secure necessary information and to give assistance and advice to organization commanders. For the planning and staff work during the Guam operation, Silverthorn received the Legion of Merit with Combat "V".

The next important battle came in the middle of September 1944, when III Marine Corps launched the Battle of Peleliu. Silverthorn distinguished himself again during the planning and execution of the campaign and was promoted to the rank of brigadier general in December 1944. He later participated in the Battle of Okinawa in April 1945 and received the Navy Distinguished Service Medal for his service during Peleliu and Okinawa campaign.

Later career

Silverthorn remained on active service after the war and was appointed to the capacity of chief of staff, Fleet Marine Force, Pacific. He served in this capacity until September 1946, when he was reassigned as commander of the Troop Training Unit, Training Command, Amphibious Forces, Atlantic Fleet, located at Naval Amphibious Base Little Creek, Virginia.

During September 1947, Silverthorn was transferred to Washington, D.C., where he was appointed a Marine Corps liaison officer with the Office of the Chief of Naval Operations under Fleet admiral Chester W. Nimitz. He remained in this capacity until May 1949, when he was promoted to the rank of major general and appointed director of the Marine Corps Reserve within Headquarters Marine Corps. Under his command, Marine Corps Reserve grew from 38,403 to 123,000 reservists.

A great honor and also responsibility came in July 1950, when Silverthorn was appointed Assistant Commandant of the Marine Corps, succeeding Major General Oliver P. Smith in this capacity. For his new duties, he was promoted to the temporary rank of lieutenant general on 22 February 1951. Final duties came in February 1952, when he was appointed commanding general of the Marine Corps Recruit Depot Parris Island, South Carolina.

Retirement

He was placed on the retired list on 30 June 1954 and was also advanced to the rank of lieutenant general for having been specially commended in combat.

After his retirement from the Marine Corps, Silverthorn served as an assistant director of the Office of Defense Mobilization within Executive Office of the President from July 1956. He resigned from this capacity during September 1957. He was later active in the International Christian Leadership and served as its vice president.

Lieutenant General Merwin Hancock Silverthorn died of cancer on 14 August 1985, in Bethesda Naval Hospital, Maryland and is buried in Arlington National Cemetery. Each of his sons were career Marine officers:
 Colonel Merwin H. Silverthorn Jr. (1920–2008)
 Lieutenant Colonel Russell Lane Silverthorn (1922–2013)
 Captain Robert Sterner Silverthorn (1928–2013)

Decorations

References

 

1896 births
1985 deaths
People from Minneapolis
Military personnel from Minneapolis
United States Marine Corps generals
United States Marine Corps World War II generals
United States Marine Corps personnel of World War I
Assistant Commandants of the United States Marine Corps
Naval War College alumni
Recipients of the Navy Cross (United States)
Recipients of the Distinguished Service Cross (United States)
Recipients of the Navy Distinguished Service Medal
Recipients of the Legion of Merit
Recipients of the Silver Star
Recipients of the Croix de Guerre 1914–1918 (France)
Burials at Arlington National Cemetery
American military personnel of the Banana Wars